The following are the 86 municipalities of the canton of Basel-Country, as of 2009.

List 

Aesch (BL)
Allschwil
Anwil
Arboldswil
Arisdorf
Arlesheim
Augst
Bennwil
Biel-Benken
Binningen
Birsfelden
Blauen
Böckten
Bottmingen
Bretzwil
Brislach
Bubendorf
Buckten
Burg im Leimental
Buus
Diegten
Diepflingen
Dittingen
Duggingen
Eptingen
Ettingen
Frenkendorf
Füllinsdorf
Gelterkinden
Giebenach
Grellingen
Häfelfingen
Hemmiken
Hersberg
Hölstein
Itingen
Känerkinden
Kilchberg (BL)
Lampenberg
Langenbruck
Läufelfingen
Laufen
Lausen
Lauwil
Liedertswil
Liesberg
Liestal
Lupsingen
Maisprach
Münchenstein
Muttenz
Nenzlingen
Niederdorf
Nusshof
Oberdorf (BL)
Oberwil (BL)
Oltingen
Ormalingen
Pfeffingen
Pratteln
Ramlinsburg
Reigoldswil
Reinach (BL)
Rickenbach (BL)
Roggenburg
Röschenz
Rothenfluh
Rümlingen
Rünenberg
Schönenbuch
Seltisberg
Sissach
Tecknau
Tenniken
Therwil
Thürnen
Titterten
Wahlen
Waldenburg
Wenslingen
Wintersingen
Wittinsburg
Zeglingen
Ziefen
Zunzgen
Zwingen

References

Basel-Landschaft
Basel-Country